Mukesh Kumar may refer to:

Mukesh Kumar (cricketer) (born 1993), Indian cricketer
Mukesh Kumar (field hockey) (born 1970), Indian field hockey player
Mukesh Kumar (golfer) (born 1965), Indian golfer
Mukesh Kumar Chawla (born 1974), Pakistani politician

See also
Mukesh (disambiguation)